DBASS3 and DBASS5 in computational biology is a database of new exon boundaries induced by pathogenic mutations in human disease genes.

The database has been used in a large number of studies; Google Scholar has 87 entries for papers using DBASS3, and 80 for papers using DBASS5 including
Vallée MP, Di Sera TL, Nix DA, Paquette AM, Parsons MT, Bell R, Hoffman A, Hogervorst FB, Goldgar DE, Spurdle AB, Tavtigian SV. Adding in silico assessment of potential splice aberration to the integrated evaluation of BRCA gene unclassified variants. Human Mutation. 2016 Jul;37(7):627-39.
Dhir A, Buratti E. Alternative splicing: role of pseudoexons in human disease and potential therapeutic strategies.   The FEBS Journal. 2010 Feb 1;277(4):841-55.
Vallée MP, Francy TC, Judkins MK, Babikyan D, Lesueur F, Gammon A, Goldgar DE, Couch FJ, Tavtigian SV. Classification of missense substitutions in the BRCA genes: A database dedicated to Ex‐UVs. Human mutation. 2012 Jan;33(1):22-8.
Churbanov A, Vořechovský I, Hicks C. A method of predicting changes in human gene splicing induced by genetic variants in context of cis-acting elements. BMC Bioinformatics. 2010 Dec;11(1):1-2.
Wang J, Zhang J, Li K, Zhao W, Cui Q. SpliceDisease database: linking RNA splicing and disease. Nucleic Acids Research. 2012 Jan 1;40(D1):D1055-9.

See also 
 Human diseases markers

References

External links 
 http://www.dbass.org.uk/.

Biological databases
Gene expression
RNA
RNA splicing
Spliceosome